Capri Philosophical Park (Italian Parco Filosofico) is situated on the outskirts of the small 
town of Anacapri on the Italian island of Capri. 

The park was founded in 2000 by the Swedish professor and author Gunnar Adler-Karlsson together with his wife.

In the park there are small tablets with quotes by 60 different Western philosophers.

References

External links
 philosophicalpark.org

Parks in Campania
Capri, Campania